Kinclaven Station, often referred to as Kinclaven, is a pastoral lease that operates as a cattle station.

The property is able to carry a flock of 33,250 sheep.

The station is an amalgamation of several leases including Seemore Downs and Premier Downs. The area was first used for pastoral pursuits in the early 1900s by J. D. Ryan, who ran stock to supply meat to the workers on the Trans-Australian Railway line, which passed through the holding. In the 1920s the lease was acquired by the Dimer brothers who also owned Nanambinnia. By the 1930s the Dimers had sunk more wells in the area and installed windmills, the built cattle yards and constructed a small cottage on the property. The Dimers continued to acquire surrounding leases through the 1930s and in 1936 the homestead building was taken from the Eyre repeater station and was moved to the Seemore Downs lease and rebuilt. The building had originally been built in 1877.

By the 1960s leases in the area were reallocated comprising much larger and more viable areas. M. H. Kittle took up Seemore Downs and Premier Downs and established an outcamp at Endeavour bore. He also employed a station manager and changed the herd to shorthorn cattle. By 1978, after a four years of below average rainfall, the property was carrying 700 head of cattle. In 1982 the Hoggs acquired the leases of Seemore Downs and Premier Downs then further leases were added to the station in 1987.

See also
List of ranches and stations

References

Goldfields-Esperance
Pastoral leases in Western Australia
Stations (Australian agriculture)
Nullarbor Plain